Mill House is a historic home located at Milford, Kent County, Delaware. The house is located across from the Parson Thorne Mansion. It is a late-18th century, two-story, three bay, brick dwelling with a frame rear wing. It has a 2/3 Georgian side hall plan. It was owned by Delaware Governor Peter F. Causey (1801–1871) and was a rental property for the family.

It was listed on the National Register of Historic Places in 1983.

References

Houses on the National Register of Historic Places in Delaware
Georgian architecture in Delaware
Houses in Kent County, Delaware
Milford, Delaware
National Register of Historic Places in Kent County, Delaware
Individually listed contributing properties to historic districts on the National Register in Delaware